One Night in Bangkok is a live album by German thrash metal band Sodom, recorded in Bangkok, Thailand.

Track listing

Disc one
 "Among the Weirdcong" – 5:03  
 "The Vice of Killing" – 4:22  
 "Der Wachturm" – 3:04  
 "The Saw Is the Law" – 3:36  
 "Blasphemer" – 2:46  
 "Sodomized" – 2:56  
 "Remember the Fallen" – 4:17  
 "I Am the War" – 4:12  
 "Eat Me!" – 2:54  
 "Masquerade in Blood" – 2:53  
 "M-16" – 4:31  
 "Agent Orange" – 5:43  
 "Outbreak of Evil" – 3:34

Disc two
 "Sodomy & Lust" – 5:34  
 "Napalm in the Morning" – 6:18  
 "Fuck the Police" – 3:21  
 "Tombstone" – 4:10  
 "Witching Metal" – 2:51  
 "The Enemy Inside" – 4:36  
 "Die stumme Ursel" – 2:52  
 "Ausgebombt" – 4:38  
 "Code Red" – 4:09  
 "Ace of Spades" (Motörhead cover) – 2:46 
 "Stalinhagel" – 8:00

"Stalinhagel" is a combination of the tracks "Bombenhagel" and "Stalinorgel".
"The Enemy Inside" is a new track.

Credits
 Tom Angelripper - bass, vocals
 Bernemann - guitars  
 Bobby Schottkowski - drums

References

2003 live albums
2003 video albums
Live video albums
Sodom (band) live albums
SPV/Steamhammer live albums
SPV/Steamhammer video albums
Albums produced by Harris Johns